Colin Tilley (born June 27, 1988) is an American filmmaker, music video director, and television commercial director. Tilley is the CEO and owner of Boy in the Castle Productions. He has directed more than 300 music videos. 

Tilley directed, produced, and executive produced his first short film, Mr. Happy, starring Chance the Rapper, in 2014 and is developing several other film projects in Los Angeles, California. Tilley has produced, written and directed television commercials., including Balmain, Reebok, Yves Saint Laurent, Antonio Banderas, Kylie Jenner's "Glosses", Audi, and Nicki Minaj's perfume, Pink Friday.

Tilley has also produced and directed music videos for Kendrick Lamar, Cardi B, Justin Bieber, J Balvin, The Kid LAROI, Chris Brown, Nicki Minaj, The Game, Enrique Iglesias, Post Malone, Zendaya, Megan Thee Stallion, Justin Timberlake, Ciara, 50 Cent, Tyga, Lil Wayne, Karol G, Halsey, Skrillex, DJ Snake, and Britney Spears, among others. 

Tilley directed If I Can't Have Love I Want Power, a concept feature film starring Halsey. The film was released August 25, 2021. Tilley was honored at Camerimage in November 2021 for Achievement in Music Videos. Tilley created an NFT called Castle Kids in December of 2021.

Videography

 "Jumpin on a Jet", Future
 "Without Me", Halsey
 "Do It Again", Pia Mia featuring Chris Brown
 "Self-Made", Bryson Tiller
 "I Love You", Axwell & Ingrosso
 "That Part" featuring Kanye West", Schoolboy Q
 "Alright", Kendrick Lamar 
 "These Walls", Kendrick Lamar
 "iSpy" featuring Lil Yachty, Kyle
 "I Wanna Know", Alesso 
 "Whippin" featuring Felix Snow, Kiiara
 "Live Forever", The Band Perry 
 "Slumber Party" featuring Tinashe, Britney Spears
 "M.I.L.F. $", Fergie 
 "Never Leave", DVBBS 
 "Body On Me" featuring Chris Brown, Rita Ora 
 "I Like Tuh", Carnage
 "Replay", Zendaya
 "Beat It" featuring Chris Brown and Wiz Khalifa, Sean Kingston 
 "Crazy Stupid Love" featuring Tinie Tempah, Cheryl (formerly known as Cheryl Cole)
 "I Don't Care", Cheryl (formerly known as Cheryl Cole)
 "Fireball", Dev
 "Salute", Little Mix 
 "Mindless Behavior", All Around the World
 "Live It Up" featuring Tyga, Tulisa
 "Turn Around" featuring Ne-Yo", Conor Maynard
 "Coming with You", Ne-Yo
 "Never Let You Go", Justin Bieber
 "U Smile", Justin Bieber
 "Fa La La" featuring Boyz II Men, Justin Bieber
 "All That Matters", Justin Bieber
 "Confident", Justin Bieber
 "Anyone", Justin Bieber
 "Hold On", Justin Bieber
 "I'm a Freak", Enrique Iglesias
 "Heart Attack", Enrique Iglesias
 "No New Friends", DJ Khaled 
 "Take It to the Head" featuring Chris Brown, Rick Ross, Nicki Minaj and lil Wayne, DJ Khaled
 "I Wanna Be with You" featuring Future, Nicki Minaj and Rick Ross, DJ Khaled
 "Wild Thoughts" featuring Rihanna and Bryson Tiller, DJ Khaled
 "Shot Caller" (Remix) featuring Diddy, Rick Ross and Charlie Rock, French Montana
 "I Can Only Imagine (feat. Chris Brown and Lil Wayne), David Guetta 
 "Just One Last Time", David Guetta 
 "Ayo", Chris Brown and Tyga
 "Bitches N Marijuana", Chris Brown and Tyga
 "Next 2 You" featuring Justin Bieber, Chris Brown
 "She Ain't You", Chris Brown
 "Look at Me Now" featuring Lil Wayne and Busta Rhymes, Chris Brown
 "Yeah 3x", Chris Brown
 "No Bullshit", Chris Brown
 "Deuces" featuring Tyga and Kevin McCall, Chris Brown
 "Strip" featuring Kevin McCall, Chris Brown
 "Matrix", Chris Brown
 "Don't Wake Me Up", Chris Brown
 "Don't Judge Me", Chris Brown
 "Someone to Love Me (Naked)" featuring Lil' Wayne and Diddy, Mary J. Blige 
 "Why" featuring Rick Ross, Mary J. Blige
 "John" featuring Rick Ross, Lil Wayne
 "Ballin'"  featuring Lil Wayne, Young Jeezy
 "Krazy", Lil Wayne
 "John" featuring Rick Ross, Lil Wayne
 "No Worries" featuring Detail, Lil Wayne
"She Makes Me Wanna" featuring Dev, JLS
"Mean Mug" featuring 50 Cent, Soulja Boy
"No Sleep", Wiz Khalifa
"Fascinated"  featuring Justin Timberlake, FreeSol
"Witches Brew", Katy B
"It Girl", Jason Derulo
"Breathing", Jason Derulo
"The Other Side", Jason Derulo
"Talk Dirty", Jason Derulo
"Wiggle", Jason Derulo
"Want To Want Me", Jason Derulo
"Trumpets", Jason Derulo
"We Can Go Down", Lil B
"Fly Together" feat. Ryan Leslie and Rick Ross, Red Café
"Another Round" feat. Chris Brown, Fat Joe
"Stuck on a Feeling" featuring Snoop Dogg, Prince Royce
"Movin", Mohombi
"24 Hours", TeeFLii
"Next Time (Won't Give My Heart Away)", Keyshia Cole
"Senile", Young Money
"Ride", SoMo
"Honest, Future
"Mask Off", Future
"We Outchea", Ace Hood
"What About Love", Austin Mahone
"Shout Out", Birdman
"Stereo", Machine Gun Kelly
"My Cowboy", Jesse James
"Do It Like This", The Turf Starz
"I Am Your Leader" featuring Cam'ron and Rick Ross, Nicki Minaj
"The Boys" featuring Cassie, Nicki Minaj
"Freedom", Nicki Minaj
"Anaconda", Nicki Minaj
"Kisses Down Low", Kelly Rowland
"Bag of Money"  featuring Wale, T-Pain and Meek Mill, Rick Ross
"No Games" featuring Future, Rick Ross
"Sweet Serenade featuring Chris Brown, Pusha T
"Hijack", Tyga
"I'm Gone"  featuring Big Sean, Tyga
"Faded"  featuring Lil Wayne, Tyga
"I'm on It"  featuring Lil Wayne, Tyga
"Dope" featuring Rick Ross, Tyga
"My Glory", Tyga
"Molly" featuring Wiz Khalifa, Mally Mall and Cedric Gervais, Tyga
"For the Road" featuring Chris Brown, Tyga
"Show You" featuring Future, Tyga
"Do My Dance" featuring 2 Chainz, Tyga
"Nobody's Perfect"  featuring Missy Elliott, J. Cole
"Big Dipper feat. Luciana" The Cataracs
"Girls Go Wild"  featuring Jeremih, 50 Cent
"One Night Stand" featuring Chris Brown, Keri Hilson
"Lose Control" featuring Nelly, Keri Hilson
"Ass on the Floor" featuring Swizz Beatz, Diddy – Dirty Money
"Yesterday" featuring Chris Brown, Diddy – Dirty Money
"Your Love" featuring Rick Ross and Trey Songz, Diddy – Dirty Money
"Looking for Love" featuring Usher, Diddy – Dirty Money
"Better with the Lights Off"  featuring Chris Brown, New Boyz
"Speechless", Ciara
"This Time", Melanie Fiona
"Gone and Never Coming Back", Melanie Fiona
"4AM", Melanie Fiona
"In the Air" featuring Keri Hilson, Chipmunk
"Champion" featuring Chris Brown, Chipmunk
"Down on Me" featuring 50 Cent, Jeremih
"Rockstar" feat. Brian May, Dappy
 "Good Intentions", Dappy
 "Yin Yang", Dappy
"Ain't Thinkin' 'Bout You"  featuring Chris Brown, Bow Wow (rapper)
"Best Damn Night", Six D
Last Time, Labrinth
"99 Problems", Hugo
"In Da Box"  featuring Rick Ross, Sean Garrett
"Sex Music", Tank
"Let's Get It In"  featuring 50 Cent, Lloyd
"Another Planet"  featuring Chris Brown, Jawan Harris
"Perfect Nightmare", Shontelle
"Let's Get Naughty", Jessie and The Toy Boys
"Dark Shades"  featuring Lil Wayne and Mack Maine, Birdman
"Get Like Me" featuring Nicki Minaj and Pharrell, Nelly
"GOOD BOY", G-Dragon X Taeyang (from BIGBANG)
"Mirror Man", Ella Henderson
"Louder", Neon Jungle
"Can't Stop The Love", Neon Jungle
T.A.O, Z.Tao
"JULY", Kris Wu
"Sax", Fleur East
"Middle", DJ Snake featuring Bipolar Sunshine
"No Chill" featuring Vic Mensa, Skrillex
"Purple Lamborghini", Skrillex featuring Rick Ross
"Wolves", Selena Gomez and Marshmello
"Savior", Iggy Azalea
"No Excuses", Meghan Trainor
"Taki Taki", DJ Snake featuring Selena Gomez, Ozuna and Cardi B
"Good Form", Nicki Minaj featuring Lil Wayne
"Remind Me to Forget", Kygo featuring Miguel
"Playinwitme", Kyle featuring Kehlani
"What You Want", Belly featuring The Weeknd
"No Brainer", DJ Khaled with Justin Bieber Chance The Rapper Quavo
"Kream", Iggy Azalea
"Spectacular", Curtis Roach
"Happy Now", Kygo featuring Sandro Cavazza
"Tints", Anderson .Paak featuring Kendrick Lamar
"Shot Clock", Ella Mai
"Sally Walker", Iggy Azalea
"11 Minutes", Yungblud featuring Halsey and Travis Barker
"Pure Water", Mustard with Migos
"Medicine", Jennifer Lopez featuring French Montana
"In the Dark", YG
"F&N", Future
"Go Loko", YG, Tyga, Jon Z
"Carry On", Kygo, Rita Ora
"Started", Iggy Azalea
"Summer Days", Martin Garrix, Macklemore, Patrick Stump
"Loco Contigo", DJ Snake, J. Balvin, Tyga
"Yo Le Llego", J. Balvin, Bad Bunny
"Qué Pretendes", J. Balvin, Bad Bunny
"100 Bands", Mustard, Quavo, 21 Savage, YG, Meek Mill
"Icy", Logic, Gucci Mane
"Wiggle It", French Montana Featuring City Girls
"Goodbyes", Post Malone featuring Young Thug
"Cuidao por Ahí", J. Balvin, Bad Bunny
"Fuck It Up", Iggy Azalea featuring Kash Doll
"Circles", Post Malone
"Gold Roses", Rick Ross Featuring Drake
"Que Calor", Major Lazer Featuring J. Balvin, El Alfa
"La Canción", J. Balvin, Bad Bunny
"Que Pena", Maluma, J. Balvin
"Un Peso", J. Balvin, Bad Bunny
"Fuego", DJ Snake, Sean Paul, Anitta, Tainy
"Ritmo (Bad Boys for Life)", The Black Eyed Peas featuring J. Balvin
"Hasta Que Salga El Sol" / "Fantasía" / "Nibiru" / "Eres Top" featuring DJ Snake & Diddy" / "Danzau", Ozuna
"Blanco", J. Balvin
"Morado", J. Balvin
"You Should Be Sad", Halsey
"Rojo", J. Balvin
"Amarillo", J. Balvin
"Gris", J. Balvin
"Verde", J. Balvin
"Rosa", J. Balvin
"Azul", J. Balvin
"Negro", J. Balvin
"WAP", Cardi B featuring Megan Thee Stallion
"Don't Stop", Megan Thee Stallion featuring Young Thug
"La Luz", Sech, J. Balvin
"Body", Megan Thee Stallion
 "Monster", Shawn Mendes and Justin Bieber
 "Cry Baby", Megan Thee Stallion featuring DaBaby
 "Peaches", Justin Bieber featuring Daniel Caesar and Giveon
 "Stay", The Kid Laroi featuring Justin Bieber
 "Ten Cuidado", J Balvin
 "SG", DJ Snake, Ozuna, Lisa, Megan Thee Stallion
"SEJODIOTO", Karol G
 "Her", Megan Thee Stallion
 "Ungrateful", Megan Thee Stallion featuring Key Glock
 "Ghost", Justin Bieber

Films

Mr. Happy (2015)
If I Can't Have Love, I Want Power (2021)

Awards and nominations

References

External links 
 Colin Tilley website

1988 births
Living people
Artists from Berkeley, California
American music video directors
Berkeley High School (Berkeley, California) alumni